Barceloneic acid A is a farnesyl transferase inhibitor isolate of Phoma.

References 

Transferase inhibitors
Natural phenols
Salicylic acids
Salicylyl ethers
Hydroxyquinol ethers
Phoma
Farnesyltransferase inhibitors
Diphenyl ethers